Jonathan Beaulieu-Bourgault (born September 27, 1988) is a Canadian former professional soccer player who plays as a defensive midfielder.

Career
Born in Montreal, Quebec, he helped FC St. Pauli gain promotion from the Regionalliga Nord to the 2. Bundesliga during the 2006–07 season, after being forced to sit out the prior season due to a broken leg. Beaulieu-Bourgault signed with the German side at age 17 after being scouted while playing for Lakers du Lac Saint-Louis in Quebec.

On June 21, 2010 he signed with SC Preußen Münster, where he spent two years.

International career
Beaulieu-Bourgault played for the Canada U20 national team. He made his debut in a three-match series against Brazil in May 2006. The Canadians won the first match 2–1, which was the first time any Canadian team had won against the Brazilian national team. He contributed by making a key defensive play which resulted in the attacking move which created the winning goal. Prior to that, he was a member of the Canadian team in the 2005 FIFA World Youth Championship, although he did not play for the team.

He was called up to the U20 team for the 2007 FIFA U-20 World Cup in his home nation and played in all three of the team's matches. In the match against the Congo on July 8, 2007, Canada's goalkeeper Asmir Begović was red carded for handling the ball outside the box. As coach Dale Mitchell had already made his three substitutions, Beaulieu-Bourgault took the place of goalkeeper for the final fifteen minutes of the match. He made several impressive saves and kept a clean sheet for his portion of the match (which ended 2–0 for the Congo, both goals already having been conceded by Begovic) which led to rousing applause by the Canadian fans.

On November 11, 2009 he received his first senior call-up for Canada. He made his senior debut as a substitute in a friendly against Macedonia on November 14, 2009.

Personal life
He speaks English, French and German fluently.

References

External links
 Jonathan Beaulieu-Bourgault at Kiezkicker.de 
 
 

1988 births
Living people
Canadian people of French descent
French Quebecers
Canadian soccer players
Soccer players from Montreal
Association football midfielders
Canada men's international soccer players
Canada men's youth international soccer players
2011 CONCACAF Gold Cup players
2. Bundesliga players
3. Liga players
Regionalliga players
Lakers du Lac Saint-Louis players
FC St. Pauli players
SC Preußen Münster players
SV Wilhelmshaven players
Outfield association footballers who played in goal
Canadian expatriate soccer players
Canadian expatriate sportspeople in Germany
Expatriate footballers in Germany